This is a list of radio stations in the state of Morelos, Mexico.

Defunct stations 

 XHJJM-FM 91.9, Jojutla

Notes

References

Morelos